Snake Island may refer to:

Places

Australia
 Snake Island (New South Wales), in the Hawkesbury River
 Snake Island (Tasmania)
 Snake Island (Victoria)

Brazil
 Ilha da Queimada Grande, nicknamed Snake Island, located off the southeastern corner of Brazil
 Ilha das Cobras, off the coast of Rio de Janeiro

Canada
 Snake Island (Nanaimo)
 Snake Island (Lake Simcoe)
 Snake Island, one of the Toronto Islands in Lake Ontario
 Snake Island Lake, a lake in Ontario

Nigeria
 Snake Island (Lagos)

Ukraine
 Snake Island (Ukraine), in the Black Sea

United States
 Snake Island (Massachusetts)
 Isla Culebra, Puerto Rico

Elsewhere
 St. Thomas Island, also known as Snake Island, in the Black Sea, Bulgaria
 Kalampunian Damit Island, Malaysia
 Golem Grad, also known as Snake Island, North Macedonia
 Vigan Island, also known as Snake Island, Philippines

Film and television
 Snake Island (film), a 2002 film
 Treasure Quest: Snake Island, an American reality television series

See also
 Serpent Island (disambiguation)